The Makombé River is a river in Cameroon. It joins the Nkam River near Yabassi to become the Wouri River.

References

Rivers of Cameroon
Littoral Region (Cameroon)